

Salamanders and newts

Northwestern salamander -- Ambystoma gracile
Long-toed salamander -- Ambystoma macrodactylum
Tiger salamander -- Ambystoma tigrinum
Cascade torrent salamander -- Rhyacotriton cascadae
Columbia torrent salamander -- Rhyacotriton kezeri
Olympic torrent salamander -- Rhyacotriton olympicus
Coastal giant salamander -- Dicamptodon tenebrosus
Cope's giant salamander -- Dicamptodon copei
Rough-skinned newt -- Taricha granulosa
Oregon ensatina -- Ensatina eschscholtzii oregonensis
Western redback salamander -- Plethodon vehiculum
Dunn's salamander -- Plethodon dunni
Larch Mountain Salamander -- Plethodon larselli
Van Dyke's salamander -- Plethodon vandykei)

Frogs 

American bullfrog -- Rana catesbeiana   
Cascades frog -- Rana cascadae   
Columbia spotted frog -- Rana luteiventris   
Oregon spotted frog -- Rana pretiosa   
Green frog -- Rana clamitans    
Northern leopard frog -- Rana pipiens   
Pacific chorus frog -- Pseudacris regilla  = Pacific Treefrog - (Hyla regilla or Pseudacris regilla)  
Northern red-legged frog -- Rana aurora
 Coastal tailed frog -- Ascaphus truei
 Rocky Mountain tailed frog -- Ascaphus montanus

Toads 

 Great Basin spadefoot -- Spea intermontana 
Western toad -- Bufo boreas   
Woodhouse's toad -- Bufo woodhousii

Washington, frogs and toads
Amphibians